Daniele Cristoforo Molmenti (born 1 August 1984 in Pordenone) is an Italian slalom canoeist who competed at the international level from 1999 to 2016.

Career
On 1 August 2012, his 28th birthday, he won the gold medal in the K1 event at the 2012 Summer Olympics in London. Molmenti also finished tenth in the K1 event at the 2008 Summer Olympics in Beijing.

Molmenti won six medals at the ICF Canoe Slalom World Championships with two golds (K1: 2010, K1 team: 2013), two silvers (K1 team: 2005, 2006), and two bronzes (K1 team: 2010, 2011).

Molmenti is also the European Champion from 2009, 2011 and 2012. He also has 2 silver and 3 bronze medals from the European Championships. In 2010 he won the overall World Cup title in K1. Molmenti finished the 2010 and 2011 seasons as the World No. 1 in the K1 event.

He announced his retirement from the sport in 2017, when he became the technical director of the Italian national team.

World Cup individual podiums

1 Oceania Championship counting for World Cup points
2 Pan American Championship counting for World Cup points
3 Oceania Canoe Slalom Open counting for World Cup points

Other activities
In 2016, he was one of the Italian celebrities lending their support to the Green Cross campaign for World Water Day.

References

External links

2010 ICF Canoe Slalom World Championships 12 September 2010 K1 men's total results. – Retrieved 12 September 2010.
Beijing2008.cn profile

1984 births
Living people
Canoeists at the 2008 Summer Olympics
Canoeists at the 2012 Summer Olympics
Italian male canoeists
Olympic canoeists of Italy
People from Pordenone
Olympic gold medalists for Italy
Olympic medalists in canoeing
Medalists at the 2012 Summer Olympics
Medalists at the ICF Canoe Slalom World Championships
21st-century Italian people